Mark Kerr (born 2 March 1982) is a Scottish professional football player and coach.

Kerr started his career with Falkirk in 1998, and later played for Dundee United (appearing in two major finals with the club) and Aberdeen before joining Asteras Tripolis in Greece. On Returning to Scotland, Kerr played for Dunfermline Athletic, Dundee, Partick Thistle and Queen of the South before rejoining Falkirk in 2015. He made one appearance for the Scotland B team in 2005.

In October 2019, Kerr was appointed player/manager of Ayr United. He left this position on 28 February 2021 by mutual consent.

Club career

Falkirk
Raised in Coatbridge, Kerr joined Falkirk from Moodiesburn Boys Club as a sixteen-year-old, and progressed through the Youth Development scheme at Brockville, so was well known to then-manager Ian McCall and his management team.

Kerr made his Falkirk debut towards the end of the 1998–99 season at the age of 17 against Clydebank. The following season, he turned out seven times and scored his first goal in a 3–3 draw at Ayr United. For the next three seasons, he hardly missed a game for Falkirk and by the time he left, he had accumulated 125 appearances and scored nine times. He was named as the second tier's Young Player of the Year for the 2000–01 season.

Dundee United
In July 2003, he moved to Dundee United on a Bosman transfer. Their manager Ian McCall had been keeping tabs on the Scotland Under-21 player since he himself left Falkirk. Kerr soon settled at Tannadice and became a regular in the side, and by the end of his first season, he had racked up 33 League and two cup appearances. His tenacity in midfield was a feature of the latter part of the campaign in which United finished strongly to take fifth place.

Commencing the season 2004–05 in the starting eleven, Kerr suffered a dip in form and only appeared another four times before making his way back into the first team at the turn of the year. He went on to miss only one more match throughout the rest of the season, and became a vital part of the midfield as Gordon Chisholm became manager. His two goals in that term came in the Cup competitions, one in the 3–0 League Cup win over Stranraer at Tannadice and the other in the thrilling 4–3 Scottish Cup tie against Gretna; he played the entirety of the final, a 1–0 loss to Celtic.

Kerr played in the majority of matches in every season, but in the 2008 Scottish League Cup Final, with his team 1–0 ahead in the closing minutes of normal time, he was responsible for a careless backpass pounced upon by Kris Boyd who equalised for Rangers; the game moved into extra time and a penalty shoot-out, which United lost. Kerr chose to leave when his contract expired at the end of June 2008.

Aberdeen
In July 2008, it was reported that Kerr was on the verge of a move to Dundee United's New Firm rivals Aberdeen, and he subsequently moved to Pittodrie on a Bosman transfer, taking over the number 8 shirt vacated by Barry Nicholson. Kerr was made Aberdeen club captain from the start of season 2009–10. He scored once for the club, his goal coming in a 2–1 loss at home to Kilmarnock on 5 May 2010.

Greece and return to Scotland
Kerr agreed to join Greek side Asteras Tripolis; the move was announced on 6 June 2010. Asteras finished 13th in the 2010–11 Superleague Greece. Kerr played his final match for the club in September 2011.

In January 2012, Kerr signed for Dunfermline Athletic until the end of the 2011–12 Scottish Premier League season. He made his debut for the club in a 1–1 draw against Kilmarnock on 7 February 2012. However, Dunfermline were relegated at the end of the season and Kerr left the club despite manager being offered a new contract by Jim Jefferies

Dundee
After trial spells with Hibernian and Carlisle United, Kerr signed for Dundee, Dundee United's city rival. Previously, he was on the verge of joining St Johnstone, after the club signed Steve MacLean, the duo having played together during their time at Aberdeen in 2010 while MacLean was on loan. However, the move collapsed despite Kerr having a medical; he was 'frustrated' with the inability to complete the deal, and after joining Dundee, said he didn't know why his move to St Johnstone collapsed. On 15 September 2012, Kerr made his debut, playing in defensive midfield, in a 2–1 loss against Motherwell.

Partick Thistle
Kerr began summer 2013 pre-season training with Partick Thistle. On 13 July 2013, he scored a goal from 35 yards in a pre-season friendly against Dumbarton at the Bet Butler Stadium in a 4–3 win. He signed a short-term deal but was released on 30 January 2014.

Queen of the South
Kerr signed for Queen of the South on 7 February 2014, having been released by Partick Thistle. On 30 December 2014, he left the Dumfries club by mutual consent.

Falkirk (second spell)
Kerr signed for Falkirk for a second spell on 3 January 2015. Although agreeing a new one-year contract in May 2017, he was released by the club in January 2018 after the side's poor results in the first half of the 2017–18 season. One of his teammates during his return spell was Lee Miller, with whom he had also played in his early years with the club (2000–03), as well as at Dundee United (2005–06) and Aberdeen (2008–10).

Ayr United
Shortly after leaving Falkirk, Kerr signed for Scottish League One club Ayr United linking up with former manager Ian McCall for the third time. At the end of the season Kerr celebrated promotion with Ayr as league champions. Shortly afterwards, he signed a new contract for another season.

Kerr was appointed player/manager of Ayr in October 2019. After a run of one league win in ten games and with Ayr sitting second-bottom of the Championship, Kerr left Ayr by mutual consent on 28 February 2021.

International career
Having played once for the Under-21s in 2001 against Poland, Kerr made an appearance for the Scotland B team in December 2005, coming on as a substitute in the Future Cup competition, coincidentally also against Poland. Lee Miller again played alongside him for the B side.

Championship Manager
Kerr's name became known around the world to fans of the Championship Manager football video game series in the early 2000s, after some of its versions (produced around the time of his breakthrough at Falkirk) programmed his 'potential abilities' generously, whereby he would develop into one of the world's top players.

In an interview for a book based around the series, Kerr stated that he rarely played the games but had been approached on several occasions by people wishing to share stories of how 'he' helped their team to glory; in the real world, his integration into the unfamiliar environment of Greek football was made easier by his elevated profile in the virtual universe, as some of his new teammates recognised his name from the game.

Career statistics

Player

Managerial record

Honours
Falkirk
Scottish First Division: 2002–03

Dundee United
Scottish Cup: Runner-up 2004–05
Scottish League Cup: Runner-up 2007–08

Ayr United
Scottish League One: 2017–18

References

External links
 
 Dundee United FC profile
Profile at AFC Heritage Trust

1982 births
Living people
Footballers from Coatbridge
Scottish footballers
Association football midfielders
Scottish Premier League players
Scottish Football League players
Super League Greece players
Scottish Professional Football League players
Falkirk F.C. players
Dundee United F.C. players
Aberdeen F.C. players
Asteras Tripolis F.C. players
Dunfermline Athletic F.C. players
Dundee F.C. players
Partick Thistle F.C. players
Queen of the South F.C. players
Ayr United F.C. players
Scotland under-21 international footballers
Scotland B international footballers
Scottish expatriate footballers
Expatriate footballers in Greece
Scottish expatriate sportspeople in Greece
Scottish football managers
Ayr United F.C. managers
Scottish Professional Football League managers